Xugezhuang is a former village (Chinese: t , s , p Xūgèzhuāng) and modern town (Xūgèzhuāng Zhèn) of Fengnan District in Hebei, China.

It was the terminus of the second railway to be constructed in China after the abortive Woosung Railway in Shanghai. The six-mile Kaiping Tramway opened to traffic in 1881 and ran from the collieries at Tangshan to Xugezhuang (then known as Hsuokochuang), whence a canal connected it to Lutai and the river network between Beijing and Tianjin. It eventually grew into the Imperial Railways of North China and the modern Jingshan and Jingha Railways.

See also
 Claude W. Kinder
List of township-level divisions of Hebei

References

Township-level divisions of Hebei
Tangshan